Glienicke/Nordbahn is a municipality in the Oberhavel district, in Brandenburg, Germany. It is located right north of Berlin.

Situation 
Glienicke/Nordbahn is located on the northern outskirts of Berlin. The addition "Nordbahn" (Northern Railway) is based on the proximity to the 19th century-built railway line Berlin-Stralsund, the Prussian Northern Railway. The town is bordered to the south and west by the district Reinickendorf of Berlin (localities Frohnau, Hermsdorf (Berlin) and Lübars) and Schönfließ, Mühlenbecker Land. Between 1961 and 1990 was situated at the eastern border of the Berlin Wall. The village is a typical Angerdorf (meadow) of the Mark Brandenburg. The highest point of the village is the "Langeberg" with 55 m.ü.NN.

History 
 First mentioned as Glyneck in 1412.
 Devastated during the War of Thirty Years.
 Reestablished from 1670.
 During the Cold War, Glienicke shared its borders with the former West Berlin, and so between 1961 and 1990 it was separated from it by the Berlin Wall.
 After the reunification of Germany, Glienicke developed as a preferred suburb of Berlin.

Demography 
After (East) Berlin, Glienicke/Nordbahn is the most densely populated municipality of any type in what was formerly East Germany, ahead of third-place Eichwalde (both are classified as rural municipalities, or Gemeinden), and well ahead of larger municipalities with city ("Stadt") status, such as Leipzig, Halle, and Dresden.

Pictures

Politics

The Council consists of 22 members.
 SPD 5
 CDU 4
 Grüne 4
 AfD 2
 Linke 2
 FDP 2
 Glienicker Bürgerliste (GBL) 2
 Piratenpartei 1
(Election: May 26, 2019)

Mayors
 1990 - 1994 Karin Röpke
 1994 - 2010 Joachim Bienert
 2010 -      Dr. Hans G. Oberlack

Personalities

 Uwe Barschel, (1944-1987), former Prime Minister of Schleswig-Holstein, was born in Glienicke.

 Adolf von Trotha (1868-1940), Admiral of the Imperial Navy and Admiralty, was buried in the cemetery of the parish Glienicke / Nordbahn
 Gustav Bauer (1870-1944), 1919-1920 Chancellor, lived from 1940 to 1944 in Glienicke / Nordbahn, in the cemetery of the parish Glienicke / Nordbahn buried
 Walter Felsenstein (1901-1975), director, had his residence in Glienicke / Nordbahn

Freemen
 Adolf von Trotha (1868-1940), Admiral of the Imperial Navy and Admiralty
 Erich Schwabe (1909-2015), military leader of the volunteer fire department Glienicke / Nordbahn (1964–1976), oldest firefighter of Brandenburg

References

External links
  

Localities in Oberhavel